Thessaloniki, Thessalonica or Salonica is Greece's second largest city and the capital of Greek Macedonia, named after Queen Thessalonike of Macedon.

The terms may also refer to:
Thessaloniki (regional unit) in Greek Macedonia
Thessalonica of Macedon, the sister of Alexander the Great
Thessalonica (theme), a province of the Byzantine Empire
Kingdom of Thessalonica, a Crusader state
Vilayet of Salonica, a province of the Ottoman Empire